The 36th International 500-Mile Sweepstakes was a motor race held at the Indianapolis Motor Speedway on Friday, May 30, 1952. It was the opening race of the 1952 AAA National Championship Trail and was also race 2 of 8 in the 1952 World Championship of Drivers.

Troy Ruttman won the race for car owner J. C. Agajanian. Ruttman, aged 22 years and 80 days, set the record for the youngest 500 winner in history. It was also the last dirt track car to win at Indy. Ruttman's win also saw him become the youngest winner of a World Drivers' Championship race, a record he would hold for 51 years until the 2003 Hungarian Grand Prix when Spanish driver Fernando Alonso won at the age of 22 years and 26 days.

Bill Vukovich led 150 laps, but with 9 laps to go, he broke a steering linkage while leading. He nursed his car to a stop against the outside wall, preventing other cars from getting involved in the incident.

In the third year that the 500 was included in the World Championship, Ferrari entered the race with Alberto Ascari on Ferrari 375 Indianapolis. The effort gained considerable attention, but Ascari was forced to retire after a few laps when the hub of a wheel on his car collapsed. He was classified 31st. It was the only World Championship race in 1952 that Ascari entered and did not win.

Fifth place finisher Art Cross was voted the Rookie of the Year. Though at least one rookie starter was in the field every year dating back to 1911, this was the first time the now-popular award was officially designated.

Time trials
Time trials was scheduled for four days, but rain pushed qualifying into a fifth day.

Saturday May 17 – Pole Day time trials
Sunday May 18 – Second day time trials (rained out)
Saturday May 24 – Third day time trials 
Sunday May 25 – Fourth day time trials (rained out)
Monday May 26 – Fifth day time trials (rain make up day)

Box score 

Notes
 – 1 point for fastest lead lap

Failed to qualify

Frank Armi  (#39)
George Armstrong  – Did not arrive
Buzz Barton  (#58)
Joe Barzda  (#53)
Bill Boyd  (#92) – Did not arrive
Bill Cantrell (#52)
Neal Carter  (#25)
Jimmy Daywalt  (#64)
Duke Dinsmore (#68)
Giuseppe Farina  – Withdrew
Walt Faulkner (#3)
Johnny Fedricks  (#82)
Carl Forberg (#53)
Gene Force (#96)
Dick Fraizer  (#63)
Potsy Goacher  (#93)
Perry Grimm  (#55)
Peter Hahn  (#74)
Allen Heath  (#32, #97)
Tommy Hinnershitz (#27)
Jackie Holmes (#41)
Jimmy Jackson (#61)
Danny Kladis (#19)
Jud Larson  (#39, #66)
Bayliss Levrett (#69) – Wrecked practice, retired
Frank Luptow  (#56)
George Lynch  (#74)
Johnny Mauro (#35)
Mike Nazaruk (#5, #66)
Danny Oakes  (#39)
Puffy Puffer 
Paul Russo (#10)
Carl Scarborough (#33, #44)
Albert Scully  (#62) – Did not arrive
Doc Shanebrook  (#76)
Ottis Stine  (#84)
Bill Taylor  (#47)
George Tichenor  (#88)
Johnnie Tolan (#51) 
Leroy Warriner (#27) 
Chuck Weyant (#92)  – Did not arrive

Notes 
 Pole position: Fred Agabashian – 4:20.85 (4 laps)
 Agabashian's Cummins Diesel Special was the first entry in the Indianapolis 500 to be powered by a turbocharged engine (then described as "turbosupercharged").   Gear-driven centrifugal blowers known as "superchargers" had been used since the 1920s to increase the volumetric efficiency and power output of racing engines, but the Cummins Diesel was the first to make use of the "free" energy contained in the engine exhaust stream to drive a turbine wheel connected to a centrifugal blower (thus, "turbo-supercharging").
 Fastest Lead Lap: Bill Vukovich – 1:06.60 (135.135 mph)
 As of 2022, Troy Ruttman remains the youngest driver to win the Indianapolis 500, at 22 years and 80 days.
 Ruttman also became the youngest driver to win a race counting for the World Championship of Drivers. His record was broken by Fernando Alonso at the 2003 Hungarian Grand Prix.
 Alberto Ascari marked the first instance of a driver competing seriously for the World Drivers' Championship (of which the 500 was a points-scoring race) to race in the 500. Although he finished 31st at Indy, he went on to win all of the remaining races and the title.
 1952 was the only occasion when the fastest (Chet Miller) and slowest (Jim Rigsby) qualifiers for the race started next to each other.
 1952 was the first Indy 500 in which not a single relief driver was utilized during the race.

Broadcasting

Radio
The race was carried live on the radio on the Indianapolis Motor Speedway Radio Network. During the offseason, the Speedway management created the network to handle broadcasting duties in-house. The arrangement was under the flagship of 1070 WIBC-AM of Indianapolis, and featured a crew that consisted mostly of WIBC talent. WIBC landed exclusive rights of the broadcast in the Indianapolis market, which eventually would draw the ire of the other major stations in the area. In later years, the broadcast would be carried on all five stations inside the city.

Sid Collins served as booth announcer. Jim Shelton was among the turn reporters, reporting from turn 4. Gordon Graham reported from the pits and from victory lane. Like previous years, the broadcast featured live coverage of the start, the finish, and 15-minute live updates throughout the race. At least twenty stations around the county picked up the broadcast.

Championship standings after the race 

World Drivers' Championship standings

Note: Only the top five positions are included. Only the best 4 results counted towards the Championship.

References

External links
Indianapolis 500 History: Race & All-Time Stats – Official Site
Van Camp's Pork & Beans Presents: Great Moments From the Indy 500 – Fleetwood Sounds, 1975

Indianapolis 500 races
Indianapolis 500
Indianapolis 500
Indianapolis
1952 in American motorsport
Indy